"Drivin' and Cryin'" is a song recorded by American country music artist Steve Wariner.  It was released in November 1993 as the second single from the album Drive.  The song reached #24 on the Billboard Hot Country Singles & Tracks chart.  The song was written by Spike Blake and Rick Giles.

Content
The narrator has left his significant other and is talking about letting out his pent up emotions as he is driving down an unknown highway in Texas, and is contemplating driving to either Dallas or San Antonio to distract himself.

Music video
The video was directed by Deaton-Flanigen and shows Wariner along Texas State Highway 395 playing guitar with clips of him driving and in a cafe, which black and white footage of him leaving his lover. The video was filmed in Amarillo, Texas.

Chart performance

References

1994 singles
1993 songs
Steve Wariner songs
Songs written by Rick Giles
Song recordings produced by Scott Hendricks
Arista Nashville singles